Mondoperaio is an Italian cultural-political journal that is based in Rome, Italy. The magazine has a socialist stance.

History and Overview

The magazine began on 4 December 1948 as Mondo Operaio, on the initiative of the former Italian minister of foreign affairs and Socialist leader Pietro Nenni.

Constant presence among the political-cultural journals following World War II, the review intends to intervene mainly on issues of foreign policy. Become organ of the Italian Socialist Party and fortnightly in 1953, to adopt the same year a monthly edition, the journal was enriched with new themes that would find a place at the Socialist Congress in Turin (1955) focused on the dialogue with Catholics.

In the first issue of 1956 Francesco De Martino became the co-editor (Pietro Nenni would be the editor-in-chief until 1958) and, with the editorial Prospettive della politica socialista, De Martino sets new tasks of the magazine, and until 1959 the magazine would focus on the issues of Stalinism, the relationship between socialism and democracy, with the help of the then new young co-editor Raniero Panzieri. It also enriched the themes of cultural interest and publishes texts of Balzac, Brecht, Blasco Ibáñez. A scientific-literary insert will be written by Carlo Muscetta and Carlo Castagnoli between March and December 1958. In 1959 Nenni passed leadership of the magazine to Francesco De Martino.

In the pages of literature we find some critical emerging writers such as Giorgio Bassani, Franco Fortini, Joseph Petronio, Pier Paolo Pasolini, Alberto Asor Rosa and others. In 1973 the new director was Federico Coen. journal hosts debates that innovate radically the Italian political culture: in 1975 Norberto Bobbio criticized Marxist doctrine of the state; in 1976 Massimo L. Salvadori criticized Gramscian doctrine of hegemony; in 1977 Giuliano Amato opened the discussion on the need for institutional reform.

In 1985 Luciano Pellicani was the new director. In 1994 the magazine suspended its publications as a result of the dissolution of the PSI but in 1998, headed by the former Minister Claudio Martelli, the journal was published by the SDI until 2000 with a new editorial, book format and identity, based on liberal and secular roots, with a look to Europe. Among the signatures: Francesco Forte, Giorgio Ruffolo, Gino Giugni, Luciano Cafagna, Stefano Rodotà, Giuseppe Bedeschi, Luciano Pellicani, Ruggero Guarini, Ernesto Galli della Loggia, Giampiero Mughini, Emanuele Macaluso, Predrag Matvejević, Francis Fukuyama, Arnaldo Colasanti, Attilio Scarpellini, Giuliano Cazzola, Adriano Sofri, Stefano Folli, Paolo Franchi, Ferdinando Imposimato, Anna Germoni, Federico Bugno, Piero Melograni.

Luigi Covatta has been director since 2009. In 2019 the magazine was acquired by the Socialism Foundation; they placed Tommaso Nannicini and Cesare Pinelli as co-directors alongside Covatta. Among the current collaborators: Gennaro Acquaviva, Salvo Andò, Alberto Benzoni, Daniela Brancati, Simona Colarizi, Biagio De Giovanni, Antonio Ghirelli, Walter Pedullà, Giuseppe Tamburrano; Editorial Secretary is Dario Alberto Caprio and the editorial director is Roberto Biscardini.

References

External links
 

1948 establishments in Italy
Biweekly magazines published in Italy
Cultural magazines
International relations journals
Italian-language magazines
Literary magazines published in Italy
Magazines established in 1948
Magazines published in Rome
Monthly magazines published in Italy
Political magazines published in Italy
Socialist magazines